Bodi may refer to:

Bodinayakkanur, India
Bodi, Benin
Bodi White, Louisiana politician
 The Bodi people of Ethiopia
 SAP BusinessObjects Data Integrator, software
 The protagonist from the animated film Rock Dog
 Alternative name for asparagus bean in Trinidad and Tobago

See also 

Bode (disambiguation)
Bode (surname)
 Bodey, a surname
Bodhi, in Buddhism
Bodie (disambiguation)
 Body (disambiguation)